Heinrich Giovanni April (born 9 April 1980) is a South African politician who has served as a Member of the National Assembly since May 2019. April is a member of the African National Congress.

Political career
April is a member of the African National Congress. He served as the chairperson of the party's Paul Plaatjies branch, as well as the chairperson of the party's youth league in the Bavumile Vilakazi region. He was also the treasurer of the Ekurhuleni region and a member of a sub-committee.

Parliamentary career
April was sworn in as a Member of Parliament on 22 May 2019 following the 2019 general election. He was given his committee assignments on 27 June 2019.

Committee assignments
Portfolio Committee on Small Business Development
Portfolio Committee on Tourism

References

External links
April, Heinrich Giovanni at ANC Parliament

Living people
1980 births
People from Gauteng
Coloured South African people
Members of the National Assembly of South Africa
African National Congress politicians
21st-century South African politicians